Sector 70 is a residential and historical sector located in Mohali, Punjab. It is covered with Mattaur, Sector 71, Sohana, Sector 69 and Phase 7, Mohali. There are many parks, around 10, in locality among which famous is Musical Fountain Park for evening stroll and recreation activities. There are many residential complex, apartments and societies.

A historical Gurdwara named Gurdwara Mata Sunder Kaur, commemorates visit of Mata Sundari, Baba Deep Singh and Bhai Mani Singh, is situated in locality and managed by Budha Dal. Adjacent Mattaur village, also known as Komagata Maru Nagar is famous for hosting of All India Congress session in 1975 where Mrs Indra Gandhi also attended the session.

Residential Societies

Following are list of societies present in this sector:
 C-DAC Housing complex (only for C-DAC staff)
 Guru Tegh Bahadur Housing Complex (Society) - The oldest and first ever construction in sector done by Housefed, Punjab.
 Mundi Complex
 Rishi Apartment
 Ivory Towers
 LIG House
 MIG Houses
 HIG Houses
 Homeland Heights
 Mayfair

Facilities
 BSNL Telephone Exchange
 GMADA Community Centre
 CDAC Hostel

Banks
 Punjab National Bank
 Oriental Bank of Commerce
 Federal Bank
 ICICI Bank
 State Bank of India
Kotak Mahindra Bank

Healthcare
 Amar Hospital
 Regional Spinal Injury Center

Education
 St. Isher Singh Public School
 Saupins School
 Vivek High School
 The British School
 Ashmah International School

Religious
 Gurdwara Mata Sunder Kaur
 Gurdwara Singh Sabha, Sector 70
 Shiv Narain Mandir, Mattaur
 Noorani Masjid, Mattaur
 Gurdwara Singh Shaheedan, Sohana

Access
Sector 70 is situated on Himalaya Marg, on Chandigarh-Sohana road and Mohali Bypass road. It is well connected with road, rail and air. The nearest airports are Chandigarh Airport and railway station at Industrial Area - Phase 9. It is entry point from all sides of Punjab towards Mohali Bus Stand. Auto rickshaw are easily available for commuting. A few CTU local buses also available connecting PGI and Landran.

References

Mohali
Sectors of Mohali
Buildings and structures in Mohali